Autonomous Region in Muslim Mindanao general elections were held in the ARMM for the regional governor, vice-governor posts and election of members of the ARMM Regional Legislative Assembly on August 8, 2005. Voting results are listed below.

Results

Regional governor

Regional vice-governor

Members for the Regional Legislative Assembly

See also
Official Results
Commission on Elections
Politics of the Philippines
Philippine elections

References

2005
2005 elections in the Philippines
2005 in the Philippines
August 2005 vents in the Philippines